The 2006 1000km of Spa was the second automobile endurance race for Le Mans Prototype and Le Mans Grand Touring cars of the 2006 Le Mans Series season run by the ACO. It was run on May 14, 2006, at the Circuit de Spa-Francorchamps in Belgium.

Official results

Class winners in bold.  Cars failing to complete 70% of winner's distance marked as Not Classified (NC).

Statistics
 Pole Position - #5 Swiss Spirit - 2:19.538
 Fastest Lap - #17 Pescarolo Sport - 2:06.687
 Average Speed - 115.112 km/h

External links

S
1000km
6 Hours of Spa-Francorchamps